Gregory County is a county in the U.S. state of South Dakota. As of the 2020 census, the population was 3,994. Its county seat is Burke. The county was created in 1862 and organized in 1898. It was named for the politician J. Shaw Gregory.

Geography
Gregory County lies on the south line of South Dakota. Its south boundary line abuts the north boundary line of Nebraska. The Missouri River flows southeastward along its east boundary line. The county terrain consists of rolling hills, sloping to the southeast.  The eastern part of the county is etched with gullies and drainages, flowing to the river basin. The county's highest point is in the SW corner, at 2,247' (685m) ASL.

Major highways

  U.S. Highway 18
  U.S. Highway 281
  South Dakota Highway 43
  South Dakota Highway 44
  South Dakota Highway 47
  South Dakota Highway 251
  South Dakota Highway 1806

Adjacent counties

 Lyman County - north
 Charles Mix County - east
 Boyd County, Nebraska - south
 Keya Paha County, Nebraska - southwest
 Tripp County - west

Protected areas

 Burke Lake State Recreation Area
 Buryanek State Game Production Area
 Buryanek State Recreation Area
 Central Gregory State Game Production Area
 Dixon Dam State Game Production Area
 Herrick Lake State Game Production Area
 Karl E. Mundt National Wildlife Refuge (part)
 Landing Creek State Game Production Area
 Missouri National Recreational River (part)
 Randall Creek State Recreation Area
 Scalp Creek State Game Production Area
 Southern Gregory State Game Production Area
 South Scalp Creek State Lakeside Use Area
 South Shore State Lakeside Use Area
 South Wheeler State Lakeside Area
 Whetstone Bay State Lakeside Use Area
 Whetstone State Game Production Area

Lakes

 Burke Lake
 Indian Lake
 Lake Berry
 Lake Burch
 Lake Francis Case (part)

Demographics

2000 census
As of the 2000 census, there were 4,792 people, 2,022 households, and 1,290 families in the county. The population density was 5 people per square mile (2/km2). There were 2,405 housing units at an average density of 2 per square mile (1/km2). The racial makeup of the county was 93.18% White, 0.04% Black or African American, 5.59% Native American, 0.23% Asian, 0.10% from other races, and 0.86% from two or more races. 0.86% of the population were Hispanic or Latino of any race. 50.0% were of German, 7.9% Czech, 6.3% Irish, 5.7% American and 5.5% English ancestry.

There were 2,022 households, out of which 26.40% had children under the age of 18 living with them, 55.20% were married couples living together, 5.70% had a female householder with no husband present, and 36.20% were non-families. 33.90% of all households were made up of individuals, and 20.30% had someone living alone who was 65 years of age or older. The average household size was 2.32 and the average family size was 2.98.

The county population contained 24.30% under the age of 18, 5.10% from 18 to 24, 22.00% from 25 to 44, 23.80% from 45 to 64, and 24.80% who were 65 years of age or older. The median age was 44 years. For every 100 females there were 94.50 males. For every 100 females age 18 and over, there were 91.90 males.

The median income for a household in the county was $22,732, and the median income for a family was $30,833. Males had a median income of $21,063 versus $16,920 for females. The per capita income for the county was $13,656. About 15.10% of families and 20.10% of the population were below the poverty line, including 24.50% of those under age 18 and 20.60% of those age 65 or over.

2010 census
As of the 2010 census, there were 4,271 people, 1,936 households, and 1,172 families in the county. The racial makeup of the county was 89.6% white, 7.5% American Indian, 0.3% Asian, 0.2% black or African American, 0.2% from other races, and 2.2% from two or more races. Those of Hispanic or Latino origin made up 0.9% of the population. In terms of ancestry, 54.5% were German, 11.4% were Irish, 10.9% were Czech, 7.1% were English, 6.0% were Norwegian, and 2.4% were American.

Of the 1,936 households, 23.7% had children under the age of 18 living with them, 49.9% were married couples living together, 7.4% had a female householder with no husband present, 39.5% were non-families, and 36.6% of all households were made up of individuals. The average household size was 2.18 and the average family size was 2.84. The median age was 48.2 years.

The median income for a household in the county was $33,940 and the median income for a family was $44,333. Males had a median income of $30,401 versus $25,804 for females. The per capita income for the county was $21,311. About 10.7% of families and 16.0% of the population were below the poverty line, including 27.1% of those under age 18 and 19.2% of those age 65 or over.

Communities

Cities
 Bonesteel
 Burke (County Seat)
 Gregory

Towns
 Dallas
 Fairfax
 Herrick

Census-designated place
 St. Charles

Unincorporated communities
 Carlock
 Dixon
 Lucas

Townships

Burke
Carlock
Dickens
Dixon
Edens
Ellston
Fairfax
Jones
Landing Creek
Pleasant Valley
Star Valley
Whetstone

Unorganized territories

 East Gregory
 North Gregory
 Southeast Gregory
 Spring Valley

Economy
Farming and ranching are two main economic factors of the county.

Politics
Like all of South Dakota outside Native American counties, Gregory County is powerfully Republican. No Democrat has carried Gregory County since Jimmy Carter in 1976. Like almost all of rural America, recent swings away from the Democratic Party have been very rapid: Donald Trump's 78.4 percent of the county's vote is the largest any candidate has obtained in the county since South Dakota statehood.

National Register of Historic Places sites
 National Register of Historic Places listings in Gregory County, South Dakota
 Fort Randall

References

 
South Dakota counties on the Missouri River
1898 establishments in South Dakota
Populated places established in 1898